Solanki may refer to:
Solanki (name), surname and given name
Solanki (clan), Indian social group
Solanki dynasty, alternate name for the Chaulukya dynasty

See also
Chalukya (disambiguation)